The 1979 Custom Credit Australian Indoor Championships was a men's tennis tournament played on indoor hard courts at the Hordern Pavilion in Sydney, Australia and was part of the 1979 Colgate-Palmolive Grand Prix. It was the seventh edition of the tournament and was held from 15 October through 21 October 1979. First-seeded Vitas Gerulaitis won the singles title.

Finals

Singles

 Vitas Gerulaitis defeated  Guillermo Vilas 4–6, 6–3, 6–1, 7–6
 It was Gerulaitis' 3rd title of the year and the 22nd of his career.

Doubles

 Rod Frawley /  Francisco González defeated  Vijay Amritraj /  Pat Du Pré by default
 It was Frawley's only title of the year and the 1st of his career. It was González's 2nd title of the year and the 2nd of his career.

References

External links
 ITF tournament edition details

 
Custom Credit Australian Indoor Championships
Australian Indoor Tennis Championships
Custom Credit Australian Indoor Championships
Custom Credit Australian Indoor Championships, 1979
Custom Credit Australian Indoor Championships
Sports competitions in Sydney
Tennis in New South Wales